Sakshi (meaning: The witness) is a novel written by S.L. Bhyrappa, which was first published in 1986. As of May 2018, it had 9 reprints and has been translated into Hindi and English languages. The book has been translated into English by Niyogi Books

References

Kannada novels
1986 novels
1986 Indian novels
Novels by S. L. Bhyrappa